East High School was a public high school located in Cleveland, Ohio.  It is part of the Cleveland Metropolitan School District. East's sports teams were nicknamed the Blue Bombers. The school gymnasium suffered a roof collapse in 2000. On June 10, 2010, East High was closed by the 2010 Academic Transformation Plan that was issued by the Cleveland School System.

East High School utilized a small school concept.  The three small schools once housed on East's Campus were:
School of Applied Science and Technology
Academy of Creative Expression
Institute of Business, Law and Technology

Ohio High School Athletic Association State Championships

 Boys Cross Country – 1956

Notes and references

External links 
 East High School yearbooks available on Cleveland Public Library Digital Gallery, various years 1901 through 2008

Defunct schools in Ohio
Education in Cleveland
High schools in Cuyahoga County, Ohio
Public high schools in Ohio
Cleveland Metropolitan School District
Educational institutions established in 1900
Educational institutions disestablished in 2010
1900 establishments in Ohio
2010 disestablishments in Ohio